The Big Seven is a group of nonpartisan, non-profit organizations made up of United States state and local government officials. The Big Seven are:

Council of State Governments
International City/County Management Association
National Association of Counties
National Conference of State Legislatures
National Governors Association
National League of Cities
United States Conference of Mayors

These groups are influential in national government, often lobbying Congress to represent their members' interests.

References

Non-profit organizations based in the United States